Yurasovka is a rural locality (a sloboda) in Karayashnikovskoye Rural Settlement, Olkhovatsky District, Voronezh Oblast, Russia. The population was 764 as of 2010. There are 8 streets.

Geography 
Posyolok imeni Lenina is the nearest rural locality.

References 

Rural localities in Olkhovatsky District